According to a consensus of history, many adherents in the early Latter Day Saint movement practiced plural marriage, a doctrine that states that polygyny is ordained of God. Although the largest denomination in the movement, The Church of Jesus Christ of Latter-day Saints, officially abandoned the practice of plural marriage in 1890, a number of churches in the Mormon fundamentalist movement continue to teach and practice it. Historically, the Reorganized Church of Jesus Christ of Latter Day Saints (now the Community of Christ), the second largest denomination in the movement, had an anti-polygamy position.

Pre-succession crisis
The following notable Latter Day Saints are alleged to have practiced plural marriage prior to the 1844 succession crisis that followed the death of Joseph Smith, Jr.

The Church of Jesus Christ of Latter-day Saints
The following members of the LDS Church practiced plural marriage:

Presidents of the Church

Members of the First Presidency and Quorum of the Twelve Apostles

Other church general authorities

Other notable members of The Church of Jesus Christ of Latter-day Saints

Other sects within the Latter Day Saint movement

Mormon fundamentalists sects
The following are notable members of the Mormon fundamentalist movement who have practiced plural marriage:

Other Latter Day Saint sects

See also

 List of Brigham Young's wives
 List of Joseph Smith's wives

Notes

References
Brian C. Hales (2006). Modern Polygamy and Mormon Fundamentalists : The Generations after the Manifesto (Salt Lake City, Utah: Greg Kofford Books)
Andrew Jenson, Latter-day Saint Biographical Encyclopedia.
.
D. Michael Quinn, "Plural Marriage and Mormon Fundamentalisms," Dialogue: A Journal of Mormon Thought, vol. 31, no. 2, Summer 1998

Plural marriage
Mormonism and polygamy